The Isle of Skye is the largest island in the Inner Hebrides of Scotland.

Skye or Isle of Skye may also refer to:

Places 
 Skye (Charlotte), a skyscraper in Charlotte, North Carolina, United States
 Skye, Ontario, a community of The Nation, Canada
 Skye, South Australia, an eastern suburb of Adelaide
 Skye, Victoria, a suburb in Melbourne, Australia
 Skye of Curr, a hamlet near Grantown-on-Spey, Highland, Scotland
 Isle of Skye (bar), a pub in New York, United States
 Isle of Skye, Ontario, Canada, an island in Lake Muskoka, Ottawa
 Isle of Skye, a former name for Newham, Victoria, Australia
 Broadford Airfield, Scotland

People and fictional characters
 Skye (name), a list of people or fictional characters with the surname or given name
 Vicky Swain (born 1985), often known as Skye, former British professional wrestler

Other uses 
 Operation Skye, code name for the radio component of an Allied military deception in World War II
 Skye Bank, a commercial bank based in Nigeria
 Skye Records, a former music label

See also

Sky (disambiguation)
Skyy (disambiguation)